Jouli, Jauli or Jolly is a village in Muzaffarnagar district, Uttar Pradesh India. It comes under Tehsil  Jansath, Uttar Pradesh, which is one of the sub-divisions of the Sadaat-e-Bara. It is located 18km from Muzaffarnagar city and 0.5 km downstream of Upper Ganges Canal and 8 km from Bhopa. The canal is bifurcated at Jauli village, to Anupshahar branch. 

This village is inhabited by Shia Sayyids. The Sayyids of this village are Mousavi, (Kazmi) who migrated to India from Persia.

Geography
Jauli has an average elevation of 232 metres (761 feet).

History
Jauli is a very old village. Jauli is located in Uttar Pradesh the north-western part of India, about 120 km from the National Capital of Delhi. Syed Vais came to Jolly in 1579 after retirement from the Mughal Army. In the Mughal Army he worked as Mansab Dar. The descendants of Syed Vais ruled over Riyasat Haza Jauli since 1579 to 1952 (15 July) till Zamindar abolition. Syed Irtaza Hasnain and Syed Mujtaba Hasnain was the last ruler of Riyasat Haza Jauli. Mehdi Asghar (matru miya) s/o Syed Mujtaba Hasnain was the MLA from Morna vidhansaba and a very famous personality of Muzaffarnagar.

Famous Locations

 Roza-E-Imam Sajjad (A.S.) is situated in Jauli. It is the only shrine in India which is attributed to Imam al-Sajjad (a) (The fourth Imam of Shia Community).

References
 Atlas of Muzaffar Nagar
 Gazeteer of Muzaffar Nagar District
 Google Maps 

Villages in Muzaffarnagar district